Juan Tomás Ávila Laurel (born 6 November 1966) is an Equatoguinean author and activist. His parents were from the remote island of Annobón, off the West African coast. He is at the center of the feature award-winning documentary The Writer From a Country Without Bookstores.

For many years Ávila Laurel was one of the best known authors from Equatorial Guinea who opted not to live in exile. He has been a constant thorn in the side of his country's long-standing dictatorial government, engaging in protest and political activism.

His first novel to be published in English, By Night the Mountain Burns (And Other Stories, 2014), was shortlisted for the 2015 Independent Foreign Fiction Prize, and is based on his time growing up on Annobón. The Gurugu Pledge, his second novel to appear in English, was published by And Other Stories in 2017.

Ávila Laurel made headlines in 2011 by embarking on an anti-government hunger strike, and now lives in exile in Barcelona.

Novels translated into English 

 (2014) By Night the Mountain Burns. And Other Stories, UK. 
 (2017) The Gurugu Pledge. And Other Stories, UK.

Other work 
In 2003 he was appointed Joseph G. Astman Distinguished Faculty Lecturer at Hofstra University, New York. He has spoken at conferences in Korea, Switzerland, Spain and the United States. He is the author of more than a dozen books, including novels, plays, poetry, essays, and film scripts, and has several unpublished manuscripts, some of them forthcoming. Among his published titles are:

 1994 – Poemas (Ediciones del Centro Cultural Hispano-Guineano, 1994)
 1994 – Los hombres domésticos (Ediciones CCHG)
 1998 – Rusia se va a Asamse (Ediciones CCHG)
 1999 – La carga (Editorial Palmart, 1999)
 1999 – Historia íntima de la humanidad (Ediciones Pángola, Malabo, 1999)
 2000 – El derecho de pernada (Editorial Pángola, Malabo)
 2000 – Áwala cu sangui (Editorial Pángola, Malabo)
 2001 – El desmayo de Judas (Ediciones CCHG)
 2002 – Nadie tiene buena fama en este país (Editorial Malamba, Avila, España)
 2002 – Misceláneas guineoecuatorianas
 2004 – El fracaso de las sombras
 2005 – Cómo convertir este país en un paraíso: otras reflexiones sobre Guinea Ecuatorial
 2006 – Guinea ecuatorial: vísceras (Institucio Alfons el Magnanim, 2006)
 2007 – Cuentos crudos (Centro Cultural Español de Malabo, 2007)
 2008 – Avión de ricos, ladrón de cerdos (El Cobre, 2008)
 2009 – Arde el monte de noche (Calambur Editorial, 2009)
 2019 – Cuando a Guinea se iba por (Ediciones Carena, Barcelona, 2019)

See also
 Noted writers from Annobón Province
 Equatoguinean literature in Spanish

References

External links 
 "Cuando a Guinea se iba por mar"
 Malabo, el blog de Juan Tomás Ávila Laurel

Equatoguinean novelists
Male novelists
Hofstra University faculty
1966 births

Living people
People from Malabo
Equatoguinean emigrants to Spain
Equatoguinean poets
Male poets
Equatoguinean essayists
Male essayists
Equatoguinean male writers
20th-century poets
21st-century poets
20th-century essayists
21st-century essayists
20th-century novelists
21st-century novelists
20th-century male writers
21st-century male writers